American Samoa entered only one athlete to compete at the 2007 World Championships in Athletics: 100 metres runner Mathew Lagafuina.

Nations at the 2007 World Championships in Athletics
World Championships in Athletics
American Samoa at the World Championships in Athletics